Allodemis chelophora is a species of moth of the family Tortricidae. It is found on Peninsular Malaysia.

References

Moths described in 1910
Archipini
Moths of Asia
Taxa named by Edward Meyrick